Wilani (Aymara wila blood, blood-red, -ni a suffix to indicate ownership, "the one with red color", Hispanicized spelling Huilane) is a mountain in the Andes of Peru, about  high . It is located in the Arequipa Region, Arequipa Province, Tarucani District, and in the Moquegua Region, General Sánchez Cerro Province, on the border of the districts Coalaque and Matalaque. Wilani lies southwest of Pukasaya, northwest of Ch'awarani and northeast of Qillqata.

References 

Mountains of Arequipa Region
Mountains of Moquegua Region
Mountains of Peru